Greenwood, Halifax County is a rural community of the Halifax Regional Municipality in the Canadian province of Nova Scotia. It is located along Route 224, in the Musquodoboit Valley.

References
Explore HRM

General Service Areas in Nova Scotia
Communities in Halifax, Nova Scotia